Endoplasmic reticulum-Golgi intermediate compartment protein 3 is a protein that in humans is encoded by the ERGIC3 gene. It has been reported to be regulated by micro RNAs and may be important in a cancer.

References

Further reading